You and I may refer to:

Film, television and theatre
 You and I (1938 film), a German film
 You and I (2008 film), an English/Russian film starring Mischa Barton and t.A.T.u
 Jung Jae-hyung & Lee Hyo-ri's You and I, a South Korean music television program
 You and I (1923 play), originally named The Jilts by Philip Barry

Music
 You and I, an American screamo band formerly signed to Level Plane Records

Albums
 You & I (Cut Off Your Hands album), 2008
 You and I (Jeff Buckley album), 2016
 You and I (O'Bryan album), 1983
 You & I (The Pierces album), 2011
 You and I (Teddy Pendergrass album), 1997

Songs
 "Echo (You and I)" by Anggun
 "You & I" (Avant song)
 "You and I" (Celine Dion song)
 "You and I" (Chess song)
 "You and I" (Dennis Wilson song)
 "You and I" (Eddie Rabbitt and Crystal Gayle song)
 "You & I" (Graham Coxon song)
 "You & I" (IU song)
 "You and I" (Kenny Rogers song)
 "You and I" (Lady Gaga song)
 "You and I" (Medina song)
 "You & I" (One Direction song)
 "You and I" (Rick James song)
 "You and I" (Scorpions song)
 "You and I" (Will Young song)
 "You & I (Nobody in the World)", a song by John Legend
 "You and I (We Can Conquer the World)", by Stevie Wonder, covered by Michael Bublé, also covered by George Michael as "You and I"
 "You and I", by Ace of Base from The Bridge
 "You and I", by Anarbor from Free Your Mind
 "You and I", by Angela Aki from Blue
 "You and I", by Anjulie
 "You and I", by Anouk from Paradise and Back Again
 "You and I", by APO Hiking Society from Made in the Philippines
 "You and I", by Arctic Monkeys, B-side of the single "Black Treacle"
 "You and I", by Ayyan
 "You & I", by Azu from Two of Us
 "You and I", by Bad Boys Blue from Heart & Soul
 "You and I", by Bananarama from Exotica
 "You and I", by Bing Crosby from St. Valentine's Day
 "You and I", by Black Ivory
 "You and I", by Bobby Vinton, B-side of the single "Roses Are Red (My Love)"
 "You and I", by Brotherhood of Man from We're the Brotherhood of Man
 "You and I", by Budgie from Budgie
 "You and I", by Bury Tomorrow from Portraits
 "You and I", by Chasen from Shine Through the Stars
 "You and I", by The Copyrights from We Didn't Come Here to Die
 "You and I", by Chung Dong-ha
 "You and I", by Cliff Richard from Me and My Shadows
 "You & I", by Corey Hart from Jade
 "You and I", by Damien Leith from Chapter Seven
 "You and I", by David Oliver from Jamerican Man
 "You and I", by Delegation (band)
 "You and I", by Dottie West from High Times
 "You and I", by Drag from The Way Out
 "You and I", by Dreamcatcher
 "You and I", by The Duhks from The Duhks
 "You and I", by Earth, Wind & Fire from I Am
"You and I", an entirely different song by Earth, Wind & Fire from Touch the World
 "You and I", by Emma Paki from Oxygen of Love
 "You and I", by Enrique Iglesias from Sex and Love
 "You and I", by Estelle from All of Me
 "You and I", by Field Music from Field Music (Measure)
 "You & I", by Fightstar from One Day Son, This Will All Be Yours
 "You and I", by the Flaws
 "You and I, Part I", by Fleetwood Mac, B-side of the single "Big Love"
 "You and I, Part II", by Fleetwood Mac from Tango in the Night
 "You and I", by Five from 5ive
 "You and I", by Foy Vance and Bonnie Raitt from Joy of Nothing
 "You and I", by The Friends of Distinction from Whatever
 "You and I", by Future of Forestry from Twilight
 "You and I", by Garou from Piece of My Soul
 "You & I", by G Flip
 "You and I", by Half Japanese from Perfect
 "You and I", by Ingrid Michaelson from Be OK
 "You and I", by Jack Lucien from New 80s Musik
 "You and I", by James Skelly & The Intenders from Love Undercover
 "You and I", by Jeff Buckley from Sketches for My Sweetheart the Drunk
 "You and I", by Jimmy Eat World from Invented
 "You and I", by J.K.
 "You and I", by Joe Budden from No Love Lost
 "You and I", by Joe Cocker from Organic
 "You and I", by Johnny Bristol
 "You and I", by Kate Ceberano from Kensal Road
 "You and I", by Ken Dodd, B-side of the single "Tears"
 "You & I", by Krypteria from In Medias Res
 "You & I", by Local Natives
 "You and I", by The MacDonald Brothers from The World Outside
 "You and I", by Madleen Kane
 "You and I", by Marien Baker and Soraya Arnelas
 "You and I", by Marion Raven from Songs from a Blackbird
 "You and I", by Matt Bianco from Another Time Another Place
 "You and I", by The Monkees, written by Davy Jones and Bill Chadwick, from Instant Replay (1969)
 "You and I", by The Monkees, written by Micky Dolenz and Davy Jones, from Justus (1996)
 "You and I", by Morissette Amon from Morissette
 "You and I", by Nantucket from The Unreleased "D.C. Tapes"
 "You and I", by Nora Aunor from Queen of Songs
 "You and I", by Park Bom
 "You and I", by Pat McGee Band from Save Me
 "You and I", by Pete Shelley from XL1
 "You and I", by Petula Clark, written by Leslie Bricusse, from the soundtrack for the 1969 film Goodbye, Mr. Chips
 "You and I", by PVRIS
 "You and I", by Queen from A Day at the Races
 "You and I", by Rakim from The Seventh Seal
 "You and I", by Ray Charles and Betty Carter from Ray Charles and Betty Carter
 "You and I", by Roseanna Vitro from The Time of My Life: Roseanna Vitro Sings the Songs of Steve Allen
 "You and I", by Saigon Kick, included on Moments from the Fringe
 "You and I", by Sandra from The Long Play
 "You and I", by Santana from Santana IV
 "You and I", by Seth MacFarlane from Music Is Better Than Words
 "You and I", by Shane & Shane from Clean
 "You and I", by Silver Apples from Contact
 "You and I", by Stephanie Mills from What Cha' Gonna Do with My Lovin'
 "You & I", by The Struts from Everybody Wants
 "You and I", by Switch from This Is My Dream
 "You and I", by t.A.T.u. from Vesyolye Ulybki
 "You and I", by Ultrabeat from The Weekend Has Landed
 "You and I", by Unisonic from Light of Dawn
 "You and I", by Washed Out featuring Caroline Polachek from Within and Without
 "You and I", by Wendy & Lisa from White Flags of Winter Chimneys
 "You and I", by Wilco from Wilco (The Album)
 "You and I", by Xonia
 "You and I", by Yoko Ono from Starpeace
 "You and I", from the musical Chess
 "You and I (Are You Lonely)", by Elkie Brooks from Pearls III (Close to the Edge)
 "You and I (Ba-Ba-Ba)", by The Jayhawks from Tomorrow the Green Grass
 "You & I (Forever)", by Jessie Ware from Tough Love
 "You and I (Have a Right to Cry)", by Lou Christie
 "You and I (Keep Holding On)", by Billie Ray Martin
 "You and I (Voce E Eu)", by Jon Hendricks from ¡Salud! João Gilberto, Originator of the Bossa Nova
 "You and I (When We Were Young)", by Strawbs from Ghosts
 "You and I"/"Cabbage", by Mass
 "Dirimu dan Diriku" (Indonesian for "You and I"), by Chrisye from Percik Pesona
 "Du und ich" (German for "You and I"), by Schnuffel from Winterwunderland
 "Tu și eu" (Romanian for "You and I"), by Inna from the single "Crazy Sexy Wild"
 "Ты и я" (Russian for "You and I"), by Dmitry Malikov

See also
 You and Me (disambiguation)
 Tú y Yo (disambiguation) (Spanish for "You and I")
 You Am I, an Australian alternative rock band
 "You and I Both", a song by Jason Mraz
 U&I (disambiguation)
 U and I: A True Story, a book by Nicholson Baker